Neoepimorius maroni is a species of snout moth in the genus Neoepimorius. It was described by Paul Whalley in 1964. It is found in French Guiana.

References

Moths described in 1964
Tirathabini